Museum of Ostad Bohtouni is a museum in Tabriz, north-western Iran. Handcrafts of artist Bohtouni are kept in this museum, including sculptures of different stuffs like flowers, fruits etc.

The museum is located in the Sheshghelan suburb of Tabriz, next to Maqbaratoshoara and Seyed Hamzeh shrine.

References 
 http://www.ostan-as.gov.ir/english/province/museums.asp
 http://www.eachto.ir

Bohtouni